Shōfuku-ji is the name of more than one Buddhist temple in Japan.
. A Rinzai temple in Fukuoka.
. A Rinzai temple in Tokyo.
. An Ōbaku temple in Nagasaki.
. A Shingon temple in Odawara.

Other Japanese temples named "Shōfuku-ji" include:
. A Rinzai temple in Fukuoka.
. A Shingon temple in Kobe.
. A Rinzai temple in Saga.
. A Tendai temple in Shin'onsen.
. A Rinzai temple in Wakayama.

ja:聖福寺
ja:正福寺